"PC: The Songs of Patsy Cline" is the fifth studio album by Australia rock singer-songwriter and guitarist, Deborah Conway. It was released in August 2001 via Another Intercrops Production.

This album was made while Conway was in the stage show of Always…Patsy Cline, in which Conway sang of Cline's songs and received rave reviews and a nomination for the Helpmann Award for Best Female Actor in a Musical. The album is not the recording from the show itself, rather a studio recordings of Patsy Cline songs.

Track listing
 "I Fall to Pieces"	
 "Back In Baby's Arms"
 "Crazy"	
 "Sweet Dreams (Of You)" (featuring Glenn Richards)
 "Lovesick Blues"	
 "Eyes Of A Child"	
 "So Wrong"	
 "Your Cheating Heart"
 "Walkin' After Midnight"	
 "She's Got You"

Credits
 Deborah Conway - vocals
 Rebecca Barnard - vocals
 Glenn Richards - vocals ("Sweet Dreams (Of You)")
 Edmond Ammendola - bass 
 Gerry Hale - fiddle, mandolin, banjo
 Tim Neal - Hammond organ, piano, alto saxophone ("Walking After Midnight")
 Russell Smith - trombone ("Walking After Midnight")
 Willy Zygier - producer
 Cam Reynolds - producer
 Tony 'Jack the Bear' Mantz - mastering 
 Chris Thompson  - mixing

References

2001 albums
Covers albums
Tribute albums
Deborah Conway albums